VNSO may stand for:

Vietnam National Symphony Orchestra
Vserossiyskaya Natsionalnaya Skautskaya Organizatsiya, a Russian scouting organization